Marcus Hugh Tristram de la Poer Beresford, 7th Baron Decies (born 5 August 1948), is an Anglo-Irish hereditary peer.

Early life
Beresford is the only son of Arthur Beresford, 6th Baron Decies and Diana ( Turner-Cain) Galsworthy. His mother, a widow of Maj. David W. A. Galsworthy, was a daughter of W/Cdr George Turner-Cain. He has two sisters, Sarah Ann Vivien de la Poer Beresford and model Clare Antoinette Gabrielle de la Poer Beresford.

His paternal grandfather was John Beresford, 5th Baron Decies, a Representative Peer for Ireland who married two American heiresses, his grandmother Helen Gould (daughter of American railroad executive George Jay Gould I), and after her death, Elizabeth Wharton Drexel (a daughter of Joseph William Drexel, who had previously been married to Harry Lehr). When asked how to pronounce his name, his grandfather Lord Decies told The Literary Digest: "With ci as in conscience it is dee-shees, and Beresford is berysford."

Education and career
He was educated initially at Aiglon College, Chesières-Villars, Switzerland, and from 1962 to 1967 at St Columba's College, Dublin.
He graduated from Dublin University, with a Master of Letters (M.Litt). Beresford practiced as a solicitor and rose to be Chairman of A&L Goodbody, the leading Irish corporate law firm. He was a Fellow of the Chartered Institute of Arbitrators.

He succeeded to the title of 7th Baron Decies, of Decies, County Waterford in 1992.

Other activities
Lord Decies was a Trustee of the Alfred Beit Foundation from 1999 to 2014 and Chairman from 2008 to 2014. He is currently a Trustee of the Apollo Foundation. He has also been involved in the world of education being a member of the Boards of Alexandra College in Dublin, Hewetson's School in Millicent, Ireland (of which he was Chairman from 1992 to 1995), and St Columba's College, Dublin, Ireland.

Family
He married, firstly, Sarah Jane Gunnell, daughter of Colonel Basil Gunnell on 11 April 1970. They divorced in 1974. He remarried in 1981 to Edel Jeannette Hendron. Since 1989 the couple have resided in Straffan, County Kildare, and have four children:

 Hon. Louisa Katherine de la Poer Beresford (b. 1984)
 Hon. Robert Marcus Duncan de la Poer Beresford (b. 1988)
 Hon. David George Morley Hugh de la Poer Beresford (b. 1991)
 Hon. Jessica Laragh de la Poer Beresford (b. 1996)

Interests
The couple are equine enthusiasts, and trained racehorses locally with Arthur Moore for many years. His wife is a keen sportswoman who fly-fishes for Ireland and is involved with numerous charitable causes, including the Irish Haemophilia Society.

He has an enduring interest in history stimulated by his ancestors, William Beresford, 1st Baron Decies (1743–1819), who was the Archbishop of Tuam, and General William Carr Beresford, 1st Viscount Beresford, 1st Marquis of Campo Maior, GCB, GCH, PC (1768–1854), who was a general in the British Army and a Marshal in the Portuguese Army; he fought alongside The Duke of Wellington in the Peninsular War and held the office of Master-General of the Ordnance in 1828 in Wellington's first ministry. In 2019 the Irish Academic Press published his biography of the General.

Beresford is a member of both the Irish and British Commissions for Military History. He is Chairman of the Trustees of the British Cemetery, Elvas, a member of the Friends of the Lines of Torres Vedras and the Waterford Historical Society.

Bibliography
Journals
 "Ireland in French strategy 1691-1789", Post Graduate thesis (M.Litt) 
 "François Thurot and the French attack at Carrickfergus, 1759-60", The Irish Sword, X (41), 255-74. 
 "Ireland in French Strategy during the American War of Independence, 1776-83", The Irish Sword, XII (49), 285-97 and XIII (50), 20-29. 
 "William Carr Beresford and the capture of the Cape Colony and the expedition to the River Plate 1805-1806", The Irish Sword XXIX (P. 240 – 262) 
 "Francois Thurot, the Irish connection", Journal of the Cork Historical & Archaeological Society, LXXVIII (1973), 143-50.
 "The Peninsular romance of Lieutenant Waldron Kelly and Ana Ludovina de Aguilar", The Irish Sword'', XXXII (129) 2020, 299-316. 
Books
 "Marshal William Carr Beresford: ‘The ablest man I have yet seen with the army’ 2019

References

1948 births
Living people
Barons in the Peerage of Ireland
Irish people of American descent
People from County Kildare
Place of birth missing (living people)
People educated at St Columba's College, Dublin
Alumni of University College Dublin
Marcus
Alumni of Aiglon College